Humberto Curi (June 10, 1905 – August 1981) is an Argentine boxer who competed in the 1928 Summer Olympics.

He placed 4th in the 1928 Summer Olympics, after being eliminated in the quarter-finals of the middleweight class after losing his fight to Fred Mallin of Great Britain.

After the Olympics, Humberto immigrated to New York where he married Josephine Calabrese and continued to box for nearly 10 years.  He and Josephine had one son, Joseph Curi.  Joseph Curi married Susannah English and had 4 children, Anne Curi Preisig, Sarah Curi, Katheryn Curi, and Michael Curi. All are avid athletes. After retiring from the United Fruit Company, Humberto Curi moved back to Argentina, remarried, and lived until there until he died.

References

External links
Humberto Curi's profile at Sports Reference.com

source of some biographical information

1905 births
1981 deaths

Middleweight boxers
Olympic boxers of Argentina
Boxers at the 1928 Summer Olympics
Argentine male boxers